Gibina is a village on the right bank of the Mura River in the Municipality of Razkrižje in eastern Slovenia. The area traditionally belonged to Zala County in the Kingdom of Hungary and is now included in the Mura Statistical Region.

There is a small chapel with a belfry in the centre of the village.  It was built in 1924 and renovated in 1994.

References

External links
Gibina on Geopedia

Populated places in the Municipality of Razkrižje